Li Yizhi (born ) is a retired Chinese female volleyball player. She was part of the China women's national volleyball team.

She competed at the 1994 Goodwill Games and at the 1998 FIVB Volleyball Women's World Championship in Japan.

References

1977 births
Living people
Chinese women's volleyball players
Place of birth missing (living people)
Volleyball players at the 1998 Asian Games
Asian Games medalists in volleyball
Medalists at the 1998 Asian Games
Asian Games gold medalists for China
Competitors at the 1994 Goodwill Games
Goodwill Games medalists in volleyball
20th-century Chinese women